Misplaced may refer to:

 Misplaced (album), a 2006 album by Moshav
 Misplaced (film), a 1989 English-language Polish-American film

See also